The National Development League 2021 is the third tier/division of British speedway for the 2021 season.

Due to pressures caused by the COVID-19 pandemic it was decided that the league would be decided by the final table standings only, with no playoffs being held. For the same reason no Knockout Cup would be held.

Team changes
There were significant changes from the previous 2019 National Development League speedway season. Plymouth Gladiators and Kent Kings moved up a division to the SGB Championship but the latter formed a junior side called the Kent Royals to compete in the development league. The Cradley Heathens had withdrawn after the 2019 season and the Isle of Wight Warriors withdrew from the league in early 2021. Stoke Potters lost their stadium and were unable to compete but there were three teams formed junior sides which joined the league, called the Armadale Devils (parent club Edinburgh Monarchs) the Berwick Bullets (parent club Berwick Bandits) and Eastbourne Seagulls (parent club Eastbourne Eagles).

Summary
Newcastle Gems had started the season but dropped out after in June after a couple of fixtures due to financial difficulties. This was followed on 26 August by the Eastbourne Seagulls after parent club, the Eastbourne Eagles withdrew from the league because of financial problems. Their results were expunged. Mildenhall Fen Tigers won their fourth Division 3 title since 2003.

Final table

League scoring system
Home loss by any number of points = 0
Home draw = 1
Home win by any number of points = 3
Away loss by 7 points or more = 0
Away loss by 6 points or less = 1
Away draw = 2
Away win by between 1 and 6 points = 3
Away win by 7 points or more = 4

The fixture between Kent and Armadale was not held following several postponements.

National Development League Knockout Cup
The 2021 National Development League Knockout Cup would have been the 23rd edition of the Knockout Cup for tier three teams. However it was cancelled due to concerns over the Covid-19 pandemic.

Teams and final averages

Armadale Devils

Nathan Greaves 9.03
Danny Phillips 8.39
Tom Woolley 7.92
Archie Freeman 6.86
George Rothery 5.20
Gregor Millar 4.30
Lewis Millar 3.02
Sheldon Davies 2.29

Belle Vue Colts

Jack Smith 8.87
Benji Compton 8.86
Harry McGurk 7.35
Jake Parkinson-Blackburn 7.08
Connor Coles 6.75
Paul Bowen 6.00
Sam McGurk 5.94
Ben Woodhull 3.45

Berwick Bullets

Leon Flint 10.62
Luke Crang 10.29
Kyle Bickley 9.25
Greg Blair 7.91
Kieran Douglas 5.60
Ben Rathbone 5.41
Mason Watson 4.45
Ryan MacDonald 2.76

Kent Royals

Daniel Gilkes 10.96
Ryan Kinsley 9.26
Jake Mulford 8.57
Alex Spooner 7.53
Jacob Clouting 4.33
Vinnie Foord 3.33
Rob Ledwith 4.00
Josh Warren 3.00
Jamie Couzins 0.00

Leicester Cubs

Dan Thompson 10.04
Joe Thompson 9.33
Tom Spencer 7.16
Joe Lawlor 6.80
James Chattin 4.00
Ben Trigger 4.54
Mickie Simpson 3.83
Kai Ward 2.35

Mildenhall Fen Tigers

Jordan Jenkins 10.24
Jason Edwards 9.37
Luke Ruddick 8.44
Nathan Ablitt 7.05
Sam Hagon 6.75
Sam Bebee 6.22
Elliot Kelly 5.30
Luke Muff 3.20

Withdrew and results expunged

Eastbourne Seagulls

Nathan Ablitt
Richard Andrews
Henry Atkins
Connor King
Jake Knight
Nick Laurence
Danno Verge
Chad Wirtzfled

Newcastle Gems

Joe Alcock
Max Clegg
Kelsey Dugard
Josh Embleton
Arche Freeman
Danny Smith
Ryan Terry-Daley

See also
List of United Kingdom speedway league champions
Knockout Cup (speedway)

References

National League
National Development League
Speedway National League